θ Octantis, Latinized as Theta Octantis, is a single star in the southern circumpolar constellation of Octans, near the constellation border with Hydrus. It is visible to the naked eye as a faint, orange-hued star with an apparent visual magnitude of 4.78. The star is located approximately 217 light years from the Sun based on parallax, and is drifting further away with a radial velocity of +22.5 km/s.

This is an aging giant star with a stellar classification of K3III, having exhausted the supply of hydrogen at its core then cooled and expanded. It has been catalogued as a red clump giant, which would indicate it is on the horizontal branch and is undergoing core helium fusion. At present it has 16 times the radius of the Sun. This star has 1.20 times the mass of the Sun and is radiating 79 times the Sun's luminosity from its enlarged photosphere at an effective temperature of 4,325 K.

References

K-type giants
Horizontal-branch stars

Octans
Octantis, Theta
Durchmusterung objects
224889
000122
9084